Rebecca Tavo (born 23 March 1983) is a former Australian dual international. She has represented Australia in rugby sevens and touch. She has captained the Australian women's sevens team. She competed for Australia at the 2009 and 2013 Rugby World Cup Sevens. She also represented Fiji at the Rio Olympics.

Biography 
Tavo was part of the Champion Australian Women's Touch team at the 2011 Touch World Cup in Scotland. In 2006, she became BHP Billiton's first female train driver. She is also the first Rotuman female to play rugby internationally.

In 2015, she changed allegiance and played for the Fijiana team in the Oceania 7's helping them to win the tournament as well as qualify for the 2016 Summer Olympics.

References

External links

 Player Profile
 Touch Football Profile
 

1983 births
Australian female rugby union players
Australian female rugby sevens players
Australian people of Rotuman descent
Living people
Touch footballers
Rugby union in Rotuma
People from Port Hedland, Western Australia
Rugby sevens players at the 2016 Summer Olympics
Olympic rugby sevens players of Fiji
Fiji international rugby sevens players
Fijian female rugby union players
Sportswomen from Western Australia
Female rugby sevens players
Australian female rugby league players
Australia women's national rugby league team players
Fiji international women's rugby sevens players